The General Confederation of Labour is a former Portuguese trade union confederation.

References

Anarchism in Portugal
Trade unions in Portugal
1919 establishments in Portugal
Trade unions established in 1919
Trade unions disestablished in 1938